This is a list of U.S. states, federal district, and territories by total fertility rate.


Table

 has fewer than 300 occupants, mainly related to activities of the United States Air Force, none of whom is considered a permanent resident.  All other insular areas under the sovereignty of the United States are uninhabited.

See also
List of U.S. states and territories by population
Demographics of the United States
List of U.S. states and territories by birth and death rates

References

External links

Fertility rate
Fertility
Ranked lists of country subdivisions
United States demography-related lists